

Georg von Bismarck (15 February 1891  – 31 August 1942) was a German general during World War II who commanded several divisions. He was a recipient of the Knight's Cross of the Iron Cross of Nazi Germany.

Bismarck joined the army in 1910 and took part in World War I. During the interwar years he served as an officer in the Reichswehr. During World War II, Bismarck took part in the Invasion of Poland in September 1939. During the Battle of France in 1940, he commanded a motorized infantry regiment of Erwin Rommel's 7th Panzer Division.

In 1941 he was promoted to commander of the newly formed 20th Panzer Division. He led the division during Operation Barbarossa on the Eastern Front as a part of Army Group Centre. In January 1942 he was transferred to Africa to serve in the Africa Korps as commander of the 21st Panzer Division. Here he again served under Rommel. Bismarck was killed by a mine while leading the 21st Panzer Division in the Battle of Alam el Halfa, 31 August 1942.

Awards

 Knight's Cross of the Iron Cross on 29 September 1940 as Oberst and commander of Schützen-Regiment 7

References

 
 

1891 births
1942 deaths
People from Myślibórz County
People from the Province of Brandenburg
Lieutenant generals of the German Army (Wehrmacht)
Georg
German Army personnel of World War I
Recipients of the Knight's Cross of the Iron Cross
German Army personnel killed in World War II
Recipients of the clasp to the Iron Cross, 1st class
Landmine victims
German Army generals of World War II